Kukdeshwar Temple is located in Pune District of Maharashtra, India. It is about 15 km west of Junnar and lies on the banks of Kukadi River.  It is a Shiv temple noted for its beautiful sculptures and carvings. The roof of this temple is in a dilapidated state. Chavand fort, also known as Prasannagad, is approximately 3 km from Kukdeshwar temple. Nearest Town is Junnar.

References

Hindu temples in Maharashtra
Buildings and structures in Pune district